KLCR (95.3 FM, using the trademark "Lake County Radio") is a radio station broadcasting an adult contemporary music format. Licensed to Lakeview, Oregon, United States, the station is currently owned by Woodrow Michael Warren.

References

External links

LCR
Lakeview, Oregon
Radio stations established in 1975
1975 establishments in Oregon